Brian Michael Lapping CBE (born 13 September 1937) is an English journalist, television producer and historian. Lapping is also the chairman and founding member of Brook Lapping, a television and radio production company focussed on the production of historical documentaries.

Lapping began his career as a journalist working for the Daily Mirror, The Guardian and the Financial Times, before moving to producing documentaries, first for Granada Television, then for his own production studio Brian Lapping Associates. 

In 1997, Brian Lapping Associates merged with Brook Associates to form Brook Lapping Productions. Notable television productions produced by Lapping include: Obama's White House (2016); Putin, Russia and the West (2011); The Death of Yugoslavia (1995); and End of Empire (1985).

Education
Lapping was educated at the City of London School for Boys, an independent school in central London, followed by the University of Cambridge.

Personal life 
Lapping is married to Anne Lapping, and they both live in London, England. Lapping is a member of The Fabian Society, a left-wing British think tank.

Awards

State awards 
Lapping, along with his wife Anne Lapping, was awarded the title of Commander of the Order of the British Empire in the 2005 Queen's New Year Honours List for services to broadcasting.

  2005: Commander of the Order of the British Empire

Media awards 

 2017: British Academy Television Award Nominee – Best Current Affairs
 2004: British Academy Television Award Nominee – Best Current Affairs
 2003: Alan Clark Award
 2003: Harvey Lee Award

Filmography 

 Inside Obama's White House (2016)
 Exposure (2015)
 Putin, Russia and the West (2011)
 Iran and the West (2009)
 Spy Secrets (2004)
 Innovation: Life, Inspired (2004)
 Beauty of Snakes (2003)
 I Met Adolf Eichmann (2002)
 To Kill and Kill Again (2002)
 Queen Victoria's Empire (2001)
 Endgame in Ireland (2001)
 The Fall of Milosevic (2001)
 American Experience (2000)
 Finest Hour (1999)
 The 50 Years War: Israel and the Arabs (1999)
 Hostage: The Story of the Beirut Hostages, 1984-1991 (1999)
 The Death of Yugoslavia (1995)
 Death of Apartheid (1995)
 Off the Back of a Lorry (1992)
 Breakthrough at Reykjavik (1987)
 Apartheid (1986)
 End of Empire (1985)
 Cyprus: Britain's Grim Legacy (1984)
 World in Action (1971–1981)
 Politics What's it all About? (1980)
 Chrysler and the Cabinet (1976)

Publications 

 End of Empire (1985)
 Apartheid: A History (1987)
 The State of the Nation: The Bounds of Freedom (1980)
 The Labour Government, 1964-70 (1970)
 More power to the people: Young Fabian essays on democracy in Britain (1968)

See also 

 Brook Lapping
 Norma Percy

References

1937 births
Living people
Commanders of the Order of the British Empire
English television producers
People educated at the City of London School
Members of the Fabian Society